Eric Gurry (born December 14, 1966) is an American former child actor and entrepreneur.

Education and career
Gurry graduated from the University of Pennsylvania in 1989 and obtained a Juris Doctor degree from the University of Chicago Law School.

Gurry is best known for his roles in films and plays. In 1982 he appeared as Igor in Author! Author!, a role which earned him praise. He co-starred in the 1983 film, Bad Boys, opposite Sean Penn, and received praise for his portrayal of 15-year-old criminal Horowitz. He also appeared in the 1986 comedy film, Willy/Milly.

Gurry's theatre credits include the off-Broadway comedy, Table Settings (1980); and Woody Allen's Broadway play, The Floating Light Bulb (1981), with Beatrice Arthur, Danny Aiello and Jack Weston. Gurry also appeared in a handful of TV series and TV movies throughout his career.

Partial filmography

References

External links 
 
 Eric Gurry: Filmography, The New York Times 
 Something Special, MTV

American male film actors
1966 births
Living people
University of Chicago Law School alumni
University of Pennsylvania alumni